Alfred  Frölicher (often misspelled Fröhlicher) was a Swiss mathematician (8 October 8 1927 – 1 July 2010). He was a full professor at the Université de Fribourg (1962-1965), and then at the Université de Genève (1966-1993). He introduced the Frölicher spectral sequence and the Frölicher–Nijenhuis bracket and Frölicher spaces and Frölicher groups.

He received his Ph.D. from ETH Zurich in 1954, with thesis Zur Differentialgeometrie der komplexe Strukturen written under the direction of Beno Eckmann and Heinz Hopf.

Publications

References

1927 births
2010 deaths
Swiss mathematicians
Academic staff of the University of Fribourg
Academic staff of the University of Geneva